Gamand (also Romanized as Gomand; also known as Gomān, Gumant, Kamand, Kommand, and Tyutant) is a village in Mavazekhan-e Sharqi Rural District, Khvajeh District, Heris County, East Azerbaijan Province, Iran. As of the 2006 census, its population was 924, in 182 families.

References 

Populated places in Heris County